Shoshana Wodak is a computational biologist and an organizational leader in the field of protein-protein docking.
Wodak was one of the first people to dock proteins together using a computer program.

Wodak obtained her PhD at Columbia University. She was elected an ISCB Fellow by the International Society for Computational Biology in 2016 and is one of the ISCB founders.  She helped organize the Critical Assessment of Prediction of Interactions, for which she has served on the Management Group since the founding in 2002.

References

21st-century biologists
21st-century Belgian scientists
21st-century women scientists
Belgian women biologists
Belgian bioinformaticians
Fellows of the International Society for Computational Biology
Living people
Year of birth missing (living people)
Academic staff of the University of Toronto
Columbia University alumni